Calliostoma circumcinctum is a species of sea snail, a marine gastropod mollusk in the family Calliostomatidae.

Description 
The maximum recorded shell length is 13 mm.

(Original description by W.H. Dall) The solid, strong, white shell has an elevated, conical shape. It contains seven whorls The small, dextral nucleus is polished and delicately reticulate The other whorls have two sharp, much produced, thin keels These are a little recurved at their edges, and crossed only by most delicate lines of growth. The base of the shell is flattened, ornamented with nine angular ribs, the outermost produced somewhat. There is no umbilicus The aperture is subrectangular, notched by the keels. The simple columella projects somewhat at its anterior end, and is not callous. The appressed suture is distinct, not channelled.

Distribution
Found in the Caribbean Sea and the Gulf of Mexico.

Habitat 

References

 Rosenberg, G., F. Moretzsohn, and E. F. García. 2009. Gastropoda (Mollusca) of the Gulf of Mexico, pp. 579–699 in Felder, D.L. and D.K. Camp (eds.), Gulf of Mexico–Origins, Waters, and Biota. Biodiversity. Texas A&M Press, College Station, Texas.

External links

circumcinctum
Gastropods described in 1881